F32, F.32 or F-32 may refer to:
 BMW 4 Series (F32), a car
 F-32 (Michigan county highway)
 Fokker F.32, a 1929 Dutch passenger aircraft
 HMS Salisbury (F32), a 1953 British Royal Navy aircraft direction frigate
 .f32 Raw image format, used by OpenSimulator for importing & exporting terrain
 Depressive episode ICD-10 code
 F32/T32 classification in paralympic sports
 Single-precision floating-point format, as it's known by its type annotation  in Rust.